The 1984 Green Bay Packers season was their 66th season overall and their 64th in the National Football League. Under new head coach Forrest Gregg, Green Bay won the season opener at home, lost seven straight, then won seven of eight to again finish at 8–8, second in the NFC Central division.

Offseason

Draft

Undrafted free agents

Personnel

Staff

Roster

Preseason

Regular season

Schedule 

Note: Intra-division opponents are in bold text.

Game summaries

Week 1 

    
    
    
    
    
    
    
    

 James Lofton 7 Rec, 134 Yds

Week 7 at Broncos

Week 9 

 Eddie Lee Ivery 9 Rush, 116 Yds

Standings

Statistics

Passing

Receiving

Rushing

Defensive 

(some players making minor contributions have been left off the list, but their contributions are reflected in the total category)

Awards and records 
 Tom Flynn, NFC Leader, Interceptions (9)
 Tim Lewis sets franchise record with a 99-yard INT return (week 12)

Hall of Famers 
These players were inducted to the Green Bay Packers Hall of Fame in February 1984

John Brockington, RB, 1971–77
 
Dan Currie, LB, 1958–64
 
Ed Jankowski, B, 1937–41
 
Carl Mulleneaux, E, 1938–41, 1945–46

References

External links 
 The Football Database

Green Bay Packers seasons
Green Bay Packers
Green Bay